Loreto College Halt was a former halt on the Cavan to Clones Great Northern Railway (Ireland) line two miles from the town of Cavan. The halt opened to coincide with the opening of Loreto College in Cavan, a secondary school of the same name. The school remains open.

See also
 List of closed railway stations in Ireland: L

References 

 Ordnance Survey of Ireland Discovery Series 1:50,000 map no. 34 shows the station locale.

Disused railway stations in County Cavan
Railway stations opened in 1930